Dikaios (sometimes romanised as ) is a title given to holy men and women of the Old Testament in Eastern Christianity.

Usage
The term dikaios is a Greek term meaning righteous or just. 

The term distinguishes the bearer from the Christian era saints. The prominent dikaioi are celebrated with their own feast days in the liturgical year. The Maccabees are commemorated as if they were Christian martyrs, and the Coptic Orthodox Church celebrates Pontius Pilate as one of the Righteous.

Dikaios also was one of the most frequently used epithets in the titulature of the hellenized dynasts of Parthia, Cappadocia, and Pontus.

See also
Royal formula of Parthian coinage

References 

Eastern Christianity
Titles